Anaya is a municipality in the province of Segovia, Spain.

Anaya may also refer to:

People with the surname 
 Alberto Anaya, Mexican politician and senator
 Carlos Anaya, Uruguayan politician and historian
 Elena Anaya, Spanish actress
 Herbert Anaya, president of the NGO Human Rights Commission of El Salvador
 Ignacio Anaya, Mexican restaurateur
 James Anaya, US Indigenous Rights activist
 Jorge Anaya,Commander-in-Chief of the Argentine Navy
 Luis Anaya, Salvadoran professional football player
 Monica Dejesus-Anaya, American drag queen also known as Monica Beverly Hillz
 Pedro María de Anaya, military officer
 Ricardo Anaya, Mexican politician
 Romeo Anaya, Mexican boxer
 Rudolfo Anaya, Mexican-American author
 Soledad Anaya Solórzano (1895–1978), Mexican educator and writer
 Toney Anaya, U.S. Democratic politician

Other uses 
 Anaya (album), a 2009 album by flutist Nicole Mitchell
 Anaya, a planthopper in the subfamily Flatinae
 General Anaya (former administrative division), one of the original 13 delegaciones of the Mexican Federal District